Luke Patrick Reilly (born November 23, 1995) is an American-born Canadian medley swimmer. He is an international medalist and a multiple time national champion in multiple events. He was born in Dallas, Texas, and raised in Richmond, British Columbia. He trains with the Vancouver National Swim Centre.

In 2015 Luke competed at the Pan Am Games in Toronto. He won a silver medal in the 400IM.  

In 2016 Luke was left off of the Rio Olympic team. Although he missed the Swimming Canada imposed cut by 0.03, he met the Olympic requirements and won the 400 m by 4 seconds.He also won the 200IM. In winter of 2015, Luke designed a line of loungewear. However after missing the Rio Olympics, the line was discontinued.

Despite having a back injury Luke competed in the 29th Summer Universiade in Taipei City during August 2017 where he took part in both the 400 m individual medley and 200 m individual medley, being eliminated in the heats with a time of 4:24.51 and the semifinals with a time of 2:03.44 respectively.

He competed at the 2014 Commonwealth Games and finished seventh in the 400 m individual medley and eighth in the same event at the 2014 Pan Pacific Swimming Championships.

References

External links
 
 
 
 

1995 births
Living people
Canadian male medley swimmers
Commonwealth Games competitors for Canada
Swimmers at the 2014 Commonwealth Games
Pan American Games silver medalists for Canada
Pan American Games bronze medalists for Canada
Pan American Games medalists in swimming
Swimmers at the 2015 Pan American Games
Medalists at the 2015 Pan American Games
Sportspeople from Dallas
Sportspeople from British Columbia
People from Richmond, British Columbia